The Queen + Adam Lambert Tour 2012 was a European concert tour that was the first touring collaboration between British rock band Queen and American singer Adam Lambert.

History
Adam Lambert first performed with Queen as a contestant on the eighth season of American Idol. Soon after the performance, Brian May indicated to Rolling Stone that he was considering Lambert as a front-man for Queen. In November 2011, Adam Lambert joined Queen for a special performance at the MTV Europe Awards in Belfast. It was then reported in December 2011 that Taylor and May had begun discussions with Lambert for him to front Queen in concert.

The tour began in June 2012 at Kyiv's Independence Square, a joint show with Elton John in aid of the Elena Pinchuk ANTIAIDS Foundation. Following the Kyiv concert, the group was set to play a number of festival dates. The UK Sonisphere Festival was cancelled and Queen and Lambert instead performed three sold out concerts at London's Hammersmith Apollo to wrap up the tour.

Setlist

Tour dates

Tour band

 Brian May - electric and acoustic guitars, vocals
 Roger Taylor - drums, percussion, vocals
 Adam Lambert - lead vocals
 Freddie Mercury - vocals (pre-recorded)

Additional Musicians:
 Spike Edney - keyboards, vocals
 Neil Fairclough - bass guitars, vocals
 Rufus Tiger Taylor - percussion, additional drums, vocals

Notes

Cancellations and rescheduled shows

References

2012 concert tours
Queen + Adam Lambert concert tours